Follow the River is a 1995 ABC television movie based on the book Follow the River  by James Alexander Thom that told the story of the aftermath of the Draper's Meadow Massacre of 1755.

Cast

Sheryl Lee as Mary Ingles
Ellen Burstyn as Gretel
Tim Guinee as Will Ingles
Andy Stahl as Henry Lenard
Eric Schweig as Wildcat
Renee O'Connor as Bettie Draper

References
Follow the River at IMDB